Death of a Salesman is a 1949 stage play written by American playwright Arthur Miller. The play premiered on Broadway in February 1949, running for 742 performances. It is a two-act tragedy set in late 1940s Brooklyn told through a montage of memories, dreams, and arguments of the protagonist Willy Loman, a travelling salesman who is despondent with his life, and appears to be slipping into senility. The play addresses a variety of themes, such as the American Dream, the anatomy of truth, and infidelity. It won the 1949 Pulitzer Prize for Drama and Tony Award for Best Play. It is considered by some critics to be one of the greatest plays of the 20th century.

Since its premiere, the play has been revived on Broadway five times, winning three Tony Awards for Best Revival. It has been adapted for the cinema on ten occasions, including a 1951 version by screenwriter Stanley Roberts, starring Fredric March. In 1999, New Yorker drama critic John Lahr said that with 11 million copies sold, it was "probably the most successful modern play ever published."

Background 
The genesis of the play was a chance encounter between Miller and his uncle Manny Newman, a salesman, whom he met in 1947 in the lobby of a Boston theater that was playing All My Sons. Writing in a critical study of the play, author Brenda Murphy observed that Manny "lodged in his imagination and created a dramatic problem that he felt compelled to solve."

Miller later recounted that when he saw Manny at the theater, "I could see the grim hotel room behind him, the long trip up from New York in his little car, the hopeless hope of the day's business." Without acknowledging Miller's greeting or congratulating him on the play, Manny said "Buddy is doing very well.'"  Buddy was Manny's son, and Manny saw Miller and his older brother as "running neck and neck" with his two sons "in some race that never stopped in his mind." When visiting Manny as a youth, Miller felt "gangling and unhandsome" and usually heard "some kind of insinuation of my entire life's probable failure." Seeing him again in Boston, Manny seemed to the playwright to be "so absurd, so completely isolated from the ordinary laws of gravity, so elaborate in his fantastic inventions," yet so much in love with fame and fortune that "he possessed my imagination." Manny committed suicide soon after, which was the cause of death of two other salesmen Miller had known. One of Manny's sons told Miller that Manny had always wanted to create a business for his two sons. Learning that transformed Manny, in Miller's mind, to "a man with a purpose."  

Miller had been thinking about a play about a salesman for years. He also had new interest in the simultaneousness of the past and present that was evident at their meeting, as it was plain that he and his cousins were viewed by Manny as they were when they were adolescents, many years earlier. Miller sought to "do a play without any transitions at all, dialogue that would simply leap from bone to bone of a skeleton that would not for an instant cease being added to, an organism as strictly economic as a leaf, as trim as an ant."

In creating Willy and the other characters, Miller also drew on his relationship with his father as well as another salesman. Miller was himself the model of the young Bernard.

Characters 
 William "Willy" Loman: The titular salesman. The product he is selling is never disclosed. He is 63 years old, unstable, insecure, and self-deluded. He vacillates between different eras of his life throughout the play, and re-imagines them as if they were the present. Willy's age and deteriorating mental state make him appear childlike. His first name, Willy, reflects this childlike aspect as well as sounding like the question "Will he?"
 Linda Loman: Willy's loyal and loving wife. Linda is supportive and docile when Willy talks unrealistically about hopes for the future, although she seems to have a good knowledge of what is really going on. She chides her sons, particularly Biff, for not helping their father, and supports Willy even though Willy treats her poorly. She is the first to realize that Willy is contemplating suicide at the beginning of the play.
 Biff Loman: Willy's elder son. Biff was a football star with potential in high school, but failed math his senior year and dropped out of summer school when he saw Willy with another woman. He wavers between going home to try to fulfill Willy's dream for him as a businessman or ignoring his father by going West to be a farmhand where he feels happy. Biff steals because he wants evidence of success, even if it is false evidence.
 Harold "Happy" Loman: Willy's younger son. He has lived in the shadow of his older brother Biff, but he still tries to be supportive toward his family. He has a restless lifestyle as a womanizer and dreams of career advancement. He takes bribes at work. He yearns approval from his parents, but he rarely gets any. He makes things up for attention, such as telling his parents he is going to get married. His relationship with Linda is turbulent; she looks down on him for his lifestyle.
 Charley: Willy's wisecracking yet kind neighbor. He frequently lends Willy money and plays cards with him, although Willy treats him poorly. Willy is envious of him because his son is more successful than Willy's. Charley offers Willy jobs, but Willy declines every time.
 Bernard: Charley's son. In Willy's flashbacks, he is a nerd, and Willy forces him to give Biff test answers. Later, he is a successful lawyer, married, and expecting a second son – the same successes that Willy wants for his sons.
 Ben: Willy's deceased older brother, a diamond tycoon. Though long dead, Willy frequently speaks to him in his hallucinations. He represents Willy's idea of the American Dream success story, and is shown visiting the Lomans' house while on business trips to share stories.
 The Woman: A woman, whom Willy calls "Miss Francis", with whom Willy cheated on Linda.
 Howard Wagner: Willy's boss. Willy worked originally for Howard's father Frank and claims to have suggested the name Howard for his newborn son. However, he sees Willy as a liability for the company and fires him, ignoring all the years that Willy has given to the company. Howard is extremely proud of his wealth, which is manifested in his new wire recorder, and of his family.
 Jenny: Charley's secretary.
 Stanley: A waiter at the restaurant who seems to be friends or acquainted with Happy.
 Miss Forsythe: A girl whom Happy picks up at the restaurant. She is pretty and claims to have had her picture on several magazine covers. Happy lies to her, making himself and Biff look like they are important and successful.
 Letta: Miss Forsythe's friend.

Plot 

The play takes place in the present day, 1949. The setting is the Loman home in Brooklyn, which is hemmed in by apartment buildings. 

Willy Loman returns home exhausted after a failed business trip. Worried over Willy's state of mind and recent car accident, his wife Linda suggests that he ask his boss Howard Wagner to allow him to work in his home city so he will not have to travel. Willy complains to Linda that their son, Biff, has yet to do something with his life. Despite Biff's potential as a high school football star, he failed in mathematics and was therefore unable to enter a university.

Biff and his younger brother, Happy, who is temporarily staying with Willy and Linda after Biff's unexpected return from the West, reminisce about their childhood together. They discuss their father's mental degeneration, which they have witnessed in the form of his constant indecisiveness and daydreaming about the boys' high school years. Eventually, Willy walks in, angry that the two boys have never amounted to anything. In an effort to pacify their father, Biff and Happy tell him that Biff plans to make an extraordinary business proposition the next day.

The next day, Willy goes to ask Howard for a job in town while Biff goes to make a business proposition, but they both fail. Howard refuses to give Willy a New York job, despite Willy's desperate pleas. Willy then loses his temper and ends up getting fired when Howard tells him he needs a long rest and is not allowed to represent the Wagner Company anymore. Biff waits hours to see a former employer who does not remember him and turns him down. In response, Biff impulsively steals a fountain pen. Willy then goes to the office of his neighbor Charley, where he runs into Charley's son Bernard, who is now a successful lawyer about to argue a case in front of the Supreme Court. Bernard tells him that Biff originally wanted to go to summer school to make up for failing math, but something happened in Boston when Biff went to visit his father that changed his mind. Charley then offers Willy a do-nothing job, but Willy repeatedly refuses. Charley then reluctantly gives the now-unemployed Willy money to pay off his life-insurance premium, and Willy shocks Charley by remarking that ultimately, a man is "worth more dead than alive."

Happy, Biff, and Willy meet for dinner at a restaurant, but Willy refuses to hear the bad news from Biff. Happy tries to get Biff to lie to their father. Biff tries to tell him what happened as Willy gets angry and slips into a flashback of what happened in Boston the day Biff came to see him: Willy had been in Boston for work, and Biff went to visit him to ask Willy to convince his teacher to curve Biff's failing math grade. Willy was in the middle of an extramarital affair with a receptionist, when Biff arrived unexpectedly at the hotel room, and saw the woman, who was half-dressed. Biff did not accept his father's cover-up story, and angrily dismissed him as a liar and a fake before storming out. From that moment, Biff's views of his father changed and set him adrift.

Biff leaves the restaurant in frustration, followed by Happy and two girls that Happy picked up, leaving a confused and upset Willy behind. When they later return home, Linda angrily confronts them for abandoning their father while Willy remains outside, talking to himself. Biff tries to reconcile with Willy, but the discussion quickly escalates into another argument. Biff conveys plainly to his father that he is not meant for anything great, insisting that both of them are simply ordinary men meant to lead ordinary lives. The argument reaches an apparent climax as Biff hugs Willy and begins to cry as he tries to get Willy to let go of his unrealistic expectations. Rather than listen to what Biff actually says, Willy appears to believe his son has forgiven him and will follow in his footsteps, and after Linda goes upstairs to bed, lapses one final time into a hallucination, thinking he is talking to his long-dead brother Ben. In Willy's mind, Ben "approves" of the scheme Willy has dreamed up to take his own life in order to give Biff his life insurance money to help him start a business. Willy exits the house, and Biff and Linda cry out in despair as the sound of Willy's car blares up and fades out.

The final scene takes place at Willy's funeral, which is attended only by his family, Charley and Bernard (who do not speak during the scene). The ambiguities of mixed and unaddressed emotions persist, particularly over whether Willy's choices or circumstances were obsolete. At the funeral, Biff retains his belief that he does not want to become a businessman like his father. Happy, on the other hand, chooses to follow in his father's footsteps, while Linda laments her husband's decision just before her final payment on the house.

Themes

Reality and illusion 
Reality and illusion are prominent themes in Death of a Salesman. The play uses flashbacks to present Willy's memories, but it is unclear whether they are accurate. He makes up lies about his and Biff's success. The more he indulges in the illusion, the harder it is for him to face reality. Biff realizes the problem and wants to face the truth. In this conflict, the play shows how the American Dream can be a lie.

Tragedy 
In several statements, Miller compared the play's characters to Greek tragedy. The American playwright wanted to show that the common man and those with status had much in common.

Writing in The New York Times in 1999, journalist John Tierney argued that the play was not constructed like a classical tragedy. He observed that the mental illness suffered by Loman was a "biochemical abnormality" that was "not the sort of tragic flaw that makes a classic play." But he noted that "Willy's fate is supposed to be partly a result of his own moral failings, in particular the adulterous affair [...], he is haunted by the memory of his infidelity and by the fear that it ruined his son's life."

Reception

In the United States 
Death of a Salesman first opened on February 10, 1949, to great success. Drama critic John Gassner wrote that "the ecstatic reception accorded Death of Salesman has been reverberating for some time wherever there is an ear for theatre, and it is undoubtedly the best American play since A Streetcar Named Desire." Eric Bentley saw the play as "a potential tragedy deflected from its true course by Marxist sympathies."

In the United Kingdom 
The play opened in London on July 28, 1949. British responses were mixed, but mostly favorable. The Times criticized it, saying that "the strongest play of New York theatrical season should be transferred to London in the deadest week of the year." Eric Keown, theatre critic of Punch, praised the production for its "imagination and good theatre-sense", noting that "Mr. Elia Kazan makes a complicated production seem extraordinarily natural."

In Germany 
The play was hailed as "the most important and successful night" in Hebbel Theater in Berlin . It was said that "it was impossible to get the audience to leave the theatre" at the end of the performance.

In India 
Compared to Tennessee Williams and Samuel Beckett, Arthur Miller and his Death of a Salesman were less influential. Rajinder Paul said that "Death of a Salesman has only an indirect influence on Indian theatre." However, it was translated and produced in Bengali as Pheriwalar Mrityu by the theater group Nandikar. Director Feroz Khan adapted the play in Hindi and English by the name "Salesman Ramlal" played by Satish Kaushik, the son was portrayed by Kishore Kadam.

In China 
Arthur Miller directed the play himself in China, stating that it was easier for the Chinese public to understand the relationship between father and son because "One thing about the play that is very Chinese is the way Willy tries to make his sons successful." Many traditional Chinese fathers want their sons to be 'dragons.'

Productions 
The original Broadway production was produced by Kermit Bloomgarden and Walter Fried. The play opened at the Morosco Theatre on February 10, 1949, closing on November 18, 1950, after 742 performances. The play starred Lee J. Cobb as Willy Loman, Mildred Dunnock as Linda, Arthur Kennedy as Biff, Howard Smith as Charley and Cameron Mitchell as Happy. Albert Dekker and Gene Lockhart later played Willy Loman during the original Broadway run. It won the Tony Award for Best Play, Best Supporting or Featured Actor (Arthur Kennedy), Best Scenic Design (Jo Mielziner), Producer (Dramatic), Author (Arthur Miller), and Director (Elia Kazan), as well as the 1949 Pulitzer Prize for Drama and the New York Drama Critics' Circle Award for Best Play. Jayne Mansfield performed in a production of the play in Dallas, Texas, in October 1953. Her performance in the play attracted Paramount Pictures to hire her for the studio's film productions.

The play has been revived on Broadway five times:
 June 26, 1975, at the Circle in the Square Theatre, running for 71 performances. George C. Scott starred as Willy.
 March 29, 1984, at the Broadhurst Theatre, running for 97 performances. Dustin Hoffman played Willy. In a return engagement, this production re-opened on September 14, 1984, and ran for 88 performances. The production won the Tony Award for Best Revival and the Drama Desk Award for Outstanding Revival.
 February 10, 1999, at the Eugene O'Neill Theatre, running for 274 performances, with Brian Dennehy as Willy. The production won the Tony Award for: Best Revival of a Play; Best Actor in Play; Best Featured Actress in a Play (Elizabeth Franz); Best Direction of a Play (Robert Falls). This production was filmed.
 February 13, 2012, at the Ethel Barrymore Theatre, in a limited run of 16 weeks. Directed by Mike Nichols, Philip Seymour Hoffman played Willy, Andrew Garfield played Biff, Linda Emond played Linda, and Finn Wittrock played Happy.
 September 17, 2022, at the Hudson Theatre, for a limited engagement of 17 weeks. Directed by Miranda Cromwell, Wendell Pierce played Willy, Sharon D. Clarke played Linda, Khris Davis played Biff, André De Shields played Ben, and McKinley Belcher III played Happy. Pierce and Clarke reprised their roles from the 2019–20 West End production.

It was also part of the inaugural season of the Guthrie Theater in Minneapolis, Minnesota in 1963.

Christopher Lloyd portrayed Willy Loman in a 2010 production by the Weston Playhouse in Weston, Vermont, which toured several New England venues.

Antony Sher played Willy Loman in the first Royal Shakespeare Company production of the play directed by Gregory Doran in Stratford-upon-Avon in the spring of 2015, with Harriet Walter as Linda Loman. This production transferred to London's West End, at the Noël Coward Theatre for ten weeks in the summer of 2015. This production was part of the centenary celebrations for playwright Arthur Miller.

The play ran until Saturday, 4 January 2020 at the Piccadilly Theatre in London, starring Sharon D. Clarke and Wendell Pierce.

Adaptations in other media 

 1951: American film adapted by Stanley Roberts and directed by László Benedek, who won the Golden Globe Award for Best Director. Nominated for Academy Awards for Best Actor in a Leading Role (Fredric March), Best Actor in a Supporting Role (Kevin McCarthy), Best Actress in a Supporting Role (Mildred Dunnock), Best Cinematography, Black-and-White, and Best Music, Scoring of a Dramatic or Comedy Picture.
 1960: Soviet film, directed by Theodore Wolfovitch as You Can't Cross the Bridge.
 1961: Swedish film En Handelsresandes död starring Kolbjörn Knudsen and directed by Hans Abramson (in Swedish).
 1968: German film Der Tod eines Handlungsreisenden starring Heinz Rühmann and directed by Gerhard Klingenberg.
 1966 (CBS): TV film starring Lee J. Cobb, Gene Wilder, Mildred Dunnock, James Farentino, Karen Steele, and George Segal and directed by Alex Segal.
 1966 (BBC): TV film starring Rod Steiger, Betsy Blair, Tony Bill, Brian Davies, and Joss Ackland and directed by Alan Cooke.
 1979: Swedish film En Handelsresandes död starring Carl-Gustav Lindstedt and directed by Bo Widerberg (in Swedish).
 1985: American film starring Dustin Hoffman, Kate Reid, John Malkovich, Stephen Lang, and Charles Durning and directed by Volker Schlöndorff.
 1996: American film starring Warren Mitchell, Rosemary Harris, Iain Glen, and Owen Teale and directed by David Thacker.
 2000: American film starring Brian Dennehy, Elizabeth Franz, Ron Eldard, Ted Koch, Howard Witt, and Richard Thompson and directed by Kirk Browning.
 2008: Play within the American film Synecdoche, New York, starring Philip Seymour Hoffman.
 2015: Radio drama, starring David Suchet and Zoë Wanamaker, directed by Howard Davies, and broadcast on BBC Radio 3.
 2016: Play within the Iranian/French film The Salesman (Forushande), acting as counterpoint to the main plot. Starring Shahab Hosseini, Taraneh Alidoosti, Babak Karimi, and directed by Asghar Farhadi.

Awards and nominations

Original Broadway production

1975 Broadway production

1984 Broadway production

1999 Broadway production

2012 Broadway production

2019 West End production

See also 
 Happy Lowman

References

Further reading

Editions 
 Miller, Arthur Death of a Salesman (Harmondsworth: Penguin Books, 1996) . Edited with an introduction by Gerald Weales. Contains the full text and various critical essays.

Criticism

External links 

 Death of a Salesman Summary
 
 Character Analysis of Willy Loman
 Character Analysis of Linda Loman
 , by Joyce Carol Oates
 
 
  (archive)
  (archive)
  (archive)
  (archive)

1949 plays
Plays by Arthur Miller
Broadway plays
Drama Desk Award-winning plays
New York Drama Critics' Circle Award winners
Pulitzer Prize for Drama-winning works
Tony Award-winning plays
American plays adapted into films
Termination of employment in popular culture
Viking Press books
Fiction about suicide
Works about dysfunctional families
Tragedy plays
Plays set in New York City
Plays set in the 1940s